Chiloglanis igamba is a species of upside-down catfish that occurs in Tanzania's Malagarasi River, to which it is probably endemic. This species grows to a length of  SL.

References

Further reading

External links 

igamba
Endemic fauna of Tanzania
Fish of Tanzania
Freshwater fish of Africa
Fish described in 2011